Stena Hollandica, launched in January 2010, is the first of two identical Ropax ferries built by Wadan Yards in Warnemünde and nearby Wismar, Germany for Stena Line. The second of the two ships, launched towards the end of 2010, is Stena Britannica. Both ships operate (2012) across the southern North Sea between Harwich and Hook of Holland providing a twice daily service (taking seven hours) from each side. The ships were specifically designed for this route.

Power and its transmission
Stena Hollandica has four main MAN diesel engines, producing between them 33,600 kW, and providing for a maximum speed of 22 knots (25 mph). Two of the engines are rated at 9,600 kW and the other two at 7,200 kW. The engines are connected via two gearboxes to two controllable pitch propellers. The two rudders, one behind each propeller, are of the Becker flap type with twisted leading edges. Control of the bow while docking is by two tunnel thrusters.

Heat from the main engines is also used to heat the ship.

Loading characteristics
The vehicle decks can be loaded on two levels from both the bow and stern on decks 3 and 5 and there are two tier linkspans at both Harwich and Hook of Holland to accommodate the ship.

Extended gestation
The ferries, then designated "RoPax 55" ferries, were originally ordered from the ship builders Waden Yards (subsequently subsumed into Nordic Yards Wismar) by Stena Line in 2006. The total value of the order amounted to approximately €400 million. Delays arose when Stena temporarily withdrew the order in response to economic difficulties being experienced by Waden Yards. After further negotiations the order was reinstated, but the new agreement included a price cut of 6% or approximately €24 million. The ships having been completed, naming ceremonies took place on 8 June 2010 for the "Stena Hollandica" at the Hook of Holland and on 19 October 2010 at Harwich for the "Stena Britannica".

References

External links

2009 ships
Ferries of England
Ships built in Wismar
Hollandica